Mediterranean Fever is a 2022 internationally co-produced black comedy-drama film directed by Maha Haj, starring , Ashraf Farah, Samir Elias and Cynthia Saleem.

Cast
  as Waleed
 Ashraf Farah as Jalal
  as Ola
 Samir Elias
 Cynthia Saleem
 Shaden Kanboura

Release
The film premiered in the Un Certain Regard section of the 75th annual Cannes Film Festival on 25 May 2022, where it won the best screenplay award.

Reception
Kaleem Aftab of  called it a "refreshing look at the region's political turmoil with a lovely friendship at its heart."

Leslie Felperin of The Hollywood Reporter wrote that Haj "builds the story up with small jenga blocks of humor and well-observed vignettes, so soft and gentle that it’s barely noticeable when the tower starts to teeter with dread as the stakes get higher and the threat of violence more distinct."

Tim Grierson of Screen Daily wrote that the "slim" tale is "elevated" by the performances of Hlehel and Farah, "ably portraying men each dealing with secret struggles they can’t always articulate."

References

External links
 
 
2022 films
2022 black comedy films
2022 comedy-drama films
French black comedy films
German black comedy films
French comedy-drama films
German comedy-drama films
Cypriot drama films
Qatari drama films
2020s Arabic-language films